Bartira (also known as M’bicy, Burtira or Isabel Dias) (1497-1580) was the daughter of Tibiriçá, Chief of the Tupiniquim people of Piratininga and other tribes.

Bartira took the name Isabel Dias and married a Portuguese man, João Ramalho, whose settlement became the nucleus of the modern Brazilian city of São Paulo.

She and Ramalho had a number of children who married into prominent Portuguese/Brazilian families.

References

Brazilian people of indigenous peoples descent
16th-century indigenous people of the Americas
Tupiniquim people
Converts to Roman Catholicism from pagan religions
Indigenous women